Dr. Syed Hussain Zaheer Memorial High School was established in 1979 and was named in the honor of the scientist Dr. Syed Hussain Zaheer, who was the first director general of the Council for Scientific and Industrial Research, India's largest scientific council.

It is located in the heart of the city of Hyderabad, in the Indian state of Telangana. The school operates under the auspices of the Indian Institute of Chemical Technology, a research institute of international repute and governed by the Council for Scientific and Industrial Research, which gives its students, an opportunity to interact with the scientists at the institute. Mrs. Kaisar Sayeed joined as in charge headmistress in 1979 and lead the school for 34 years until she retired in 2013 as principal. Her dedication towards staff and students is invaluable and appreciated always. Mrs. Gayatri Amruth, the current principal, has been with the school since 2016.

The Indian Institute of Chemical Technology has developed a science fair at the school called "Ignited Minds" in conjunction with National Science Day in India. The school will be the site of the Dr A. V. Rama Rao Science Museum.

The school has hosted several Nobel laureates such as Robert H. Grubbs (who won the Nobel Prize in Chemistry in 2005), K. Barry Sharpless (2001) and Koichi Tanaka (2002) visited the school and spoke to the students as part of the school's relationship with the Indian Institute of Chemical Technology.

Management and facilities
The school is owned and operated by the Indian Institute of Chemical Technology. The institute provides all infrastructural support for the school.

The school has a library and science laboratories, and a computer laboratory.

Awards and recognition
The school attained State Level position at the SSC Public Examinations in 1995 in the state of Andhra Pradesh. Students have achieved prizes at district, state and national levels in science fairs, competitions, athletics and sports activities including cricket and basketball, earning trophies and cash awards. Many students obtained merit positions in VII and X and scholarships from the Education Department of the Government of erstwhile Andhra Pradesh.

Extracurricular activities
The school offers playgrounds for cricket, basketball, volleyball, table tennis, shuttle and badminton.

On 18 July 2004, the school became the champion of the inter-school hockey tournament, defeating Moulana Azad High School 3-0 in the tournament final at Gymkhana Grounds to earn the first annual V. Purushotham memorial trophy. In the 2006 tournament, Zaheer Memorial, lost in the tourney quarterfinals, falling to Vijaya High School (Kapra) by a score of 2-1.

Former Principals

References

External links
Official website
IICT "Ignited Minds" winner 2007

High schools and secondary schools in Hyderabad, India
Educational institutions established in 1979
1979 establishments in Andhra Pradesh